is a town located in Aki District, Hiroshima Prefecture, Japan. As of April 1, 2020, the town has an estimated population of 29,636 and a population density of 2,100 persons per km². The total area is 13.81 km².

References

External links

 Kaita official site 

Towns in Hiroshima Prefecture